The FA Cup 1973–74 is the 93rd season of the world's oldest football knockout competition; The Football Association Challenge Cup, or FA Cup for short. The large number of clubs entering the tournament from lower down the English football league system meant that the competition started with a number of preliminary and qualifying rounds. The 28 victorious teams from the Fourth Round Qualifying progressed to the First Round Proper.

Preliminary round

Ties

Replays

1st qualifying round

Ties

Replays

2nd replays

3rd replay

2nd qualifying round

Ties

Replays

2nd replays

3rd replay

3rd qualifying round

Ties

Replays

2nd replay

3rd replay

4th replay

4th qualifying round
The teams that given byes to this round are Stafford Rangers, Barnet, Hendon, Enfield, Telford United, Hillingdon Borough, Yeovil Town, South Shields, Chelmsford City, Grantham, Margate, Bangor City, Boston United, Rhyl, Guildford City, Blyth Spartans, Kettering Town, Lancaster City, Hayes and Bishop's Stortford.

Ties

Replays

2nd replays

3rd replay

1973–74 FA Cup
See 1973-74 FA Cup for details of the rounds from the First Round Proper onwards.

External links
 Football Club History Database: FA Cup 1973–74
 FA Cup Past Results

Qualifying Rounds
FA Cup qualifying rounds